William Joseph Hannan (3 January 1899 – 11 March 1967) was an Australian rules footballer who played with St Kilda in the Victorian Football League (VFL).

Notes

External links 

Bill Hannan's playing statistics from The VFA Project

1899 births
1967 deaths
Australian rules footballers from Victoria (Australia)
St Kilda Football Club players
Prahran Football Club players